Théodore César Muret (24 January 1808 – 23 July 1866) was a 19th-century French playwright, poet, essayist and historian.

Biography 
Born into a Protestant family expelled from France after the revocation of the Edict of Nantes, he began studying law in Rouen, which he finished in Geneva. A lawyer then a political and theater journalist with La Mode (1831–1834), La Quotidienne, L'Opinion publique (1848–1849) and also L'Union, his plays were given on the most important Parisian stages of the 19th century including the Théâtre du Palais-Royal, the Théâtre des Folies-Dramatiques, the Théâtre des Variétés, and the Théâtre de l'Odéon.

A legitimist, he was twice imprisoned for his opinions, in 1842 and 1845.

Works

Theatre 
1829: Corneille à Rouen, comedy in 2 acts
1831: Le docteur de Saint Brice, drama in 2 acts, with the Cogniard brothers
1831: Paul Ier, historical drama en 3 actes et en prose, with the Cogniard brothers
1835: Le Tasse à l'hôpital Sainte-Anne, scène historique (1580)
1837: Les droits de la femme, comedy in 1 act
1837: Pour ma mère !, drame-vaudeville in 1 act, with the Cogniard brothers
1837: Pretty, ou Seule au monde !, comedy in 1 act, mingled with song, with de Courcy
1837: Le Cousin du Pérou, comédie-vaudeville in 2 acts, with Michel Delaporte and Lubize
1838: Les coulisses, tableau-vaudeville in 2 acts
1838: Juana ou Deux dévouements, drama in 1 act, mingled with
1838: Le Médecin de campagne, comédie-vaudeville in 2 acts, with Frédéric de Courcy and Emmanuel Théaulon
1839: Les bamboches de l'année, revue mingled with couplets
1840: Le Docteur de Saint-Brice, drama in 2 acts, mingled with couplets, with the Cogniard frères
1840: L'Élève de Presbourg, opéra comique in 1 act
1840: Une journée chez Mazarin, comedy in 1 act, mingled with couplets, with Fulgence de Bury and Alexis Decomberousse
1841: 1841 et 1941, ou Aujourd'hui et dans cent ans, revue fantastique in 2 acts, with the Cogniard brothers
1841: Une vocation, comedy in 2 acts, mingled with couplets, with de Courcy
1842: Mil huit cent quarante et un et mil neuf cent quarante et un..., revue fantastique, with the Cogniard brothers
1842: Les Philanthropes, comedy in 3 acts, in verse, with de Courcy
1844: Les Iles Marquises, revue of the year 1843, in 2 acts, with the Cogniard brothers
1846: Si j'étais homme ou les canotiers de Paris, comédie vaudeville in 2 acts, with Laurencin
1848: Les Marrons d'Inde, ou les Grotesques de l'année, revue fantastique in 3 acts and 8 tableaux, with the Cogniard brothers
1851: La Course au plaisir, revue of 1851, in 2 acts and 3 tableaux, with Michel Delaporte and Gaston de Montheau
1856: Michel Cervantès, drama in 5 acts, in verse
1859: Les Dettes, comedy in 3 acts, in verse

History 
1833: Jacques le Chouan : Madame en Vendée
1834: Le Chevalier de Saint-Pont (histoire de 1784)
1836: Gresset (Jean-Baptiste-Louis)
1836: Mademoiselle de Montpensier, histoire du temps de la Fronde (1652)
1837: Histoire de Paris depuis son origine jusqu'à nos jours
1837–1838: Les Grands hommes de la France, 2 vol.
1839: Souvenirs de l'Ouest
1840: Vie populaire de Henri de France
1842: La Vie et la mort du duc d'Orléans, prince royal
1843: Le Grand convoi de la ville de Rouen
1844: Voyage et séjour de Henri de France dans la Grande-Bretagne, octobre 1843-janvier 1844
1844: Histoire de l'armée de Condé, 2 vol.
1845: Vie populaire de Bonchamps
1845: Vie populaire de Cathelineau
1845: Vie populaire de Charette
1845: Vie populaire de Georges Cadoudal
1845: Vie populaire de Henri de La Rochejaquelein
1846: Mariage de Henri de France, relation populaire
1848: Histoire des guerres de l'Ouest : Vendée, chouannerie (1792-1815)
1849: Vie de Henri de France, abrégé
1850: Les Ravageurs
1850: Album de l'exil
1853: Histoire de Henri Arnaud, pasteur et chef militaire des Vaudois du Piémont, résumé de l'histoire vaudoise
1854: Les Galériens protestants
1860: Italie. Au roi Victor-Emmanuel, au comte de Cavour, au général Garibaldi
1861: Histoire de Jeanne d'Albret, reine de Navarre, preceded by a Étude sur Marguerite de Valois, sa mère
1865: L'Histoire par le théâtre, 1789-1851, 3 vol.

Essais 
1835: Georges, ou Un entre mille
1842: Simples questions d'un ignorant au sujet des chemins de fer en général, et du chemin de fer de Paris à Rouen et au Havre en particulier
1843: Le Drapeau anglais
1849: La Vérité aux ouvriers, aux paysans, aux soldats, simples paroles
1849: Casse-cou ! socialisme, impérialisme, orléanisme
1850: Démocratie blanche
1851: Le Bon messager, almanach pour l'an de grâce 1842
1855: Paroles d'un protestant
1858: A travers champs, souvenirs et propos divers
1861: Le Théâtre-français de la rue de Richelieu, histoire théâtrale

Poetry 
undated: A propos d'un chien
undated: Le nez rouge
1847: Comment on dégénère
1852: Paris à Dieppe, speech in verse

Novel 
1845: Une histoire de voleur

Bibliography 
 Charles Dezobry, Théodore Bachelet, Dictionnaire général de biographie et d'histoire, 1869, (p. 2961) 
 Gustave Vapereau, Dictionnaire universel des contemporains, vol.2, 1870, (p. 1324) Read inline 
 Jules Gay, Bibliographie des ouvrages relatifs à l'amour, aux femmes..., 1872, (p. 148–149)
 George Ripley, Charles Anderson Dana, The American Cyclopaedia: A Popular Dictionary, 1875, (p. 54)
 Ludovic Lalanne, Dictionnaire historique de la France, 1877, (p. 1333)
 Camille Dreyfus, André Berthelot, La Grande encyclopédie: inventaire raisonné des sciences, 1886, (p. 575)
 Pierre Larousse, Claude Augé, Nouveau Larousse illustré: dictionnaire universel, 1898, (p. 269)
 Pierre Henri Guignard, Les servitudes foncières dans le Code civil vaudois, 1975, (p. 16)
 Edmond Biré, La presse royaliste de 1830 à 1852, 1901, (p. 365)
 Louis Aymer de La Chevalerie (marquis d'), Henri Carré, Le journal d'émigration, 1791-1797, 1933, (p. 58)

References

External links 
 Théodore Muret on data.bnf.fr

19th-century French dramatists and playwrights
19th-century French poets
19th-century French essayists
19th-century French historians
Writers from Rouen
1808 births
1866 deaths